W.A.K.O. European Championships 1984 were the seventh European kickboxing championships hosted by the W.A.K.O. organization arranged by Peter Land.  The championships were open to amateur men based in Europe with each country allowed only one competitor per weight division, with the styles on offer being Full-Contact and Semi-Contact kickboxing.  Regular European leaders West Germany were the top nation by the end of the championships, followed by Italy in second and hosts Austria in third.  The event was held in Graz, Austria on Saturday, 22 September 1984.

Men's Full-Contact Kickboxing

Full-Contact had been absent at the last European championships, but returned in 1984.  There were now ten weight classes ranging from 54 kg/118.8 lbs to over 87 kg/191.4 lbs, with the 54 kg division being newly introduced and the two heaviest divisions being changed slightly from the last world championships.  All of the bouts were fought under Full-Contact rules, and more detail can be found on the W.A.K.O. website – although the rules may have changed slightly since 1984.  The most notable winner was Ferdinand Mack who won his sixth W.A.K.O. gold medal (Euro and world).  By the end of the championships, West Germany once more were the top nation in Europe in Full-Contact winning four gold and two silver medals.

Men's Full-Contact Kickboxing Medals Table

Men's Semi-Contact Kickboxing

Semi-Contact differed from Full-Contact in that fighters were won by points given due to technique, skill and speed, with physical force limited - more information on Semi-Contact can be found on the W.A.K.O. website, although the rules will have changed since 1984.  There were fewer weight divisions when compared to Full-Contact with seven ranging from 57 kg/125.4 lbs to over 84 kg/+184.8 lbs.  By the championships end the top nation in Semi-Contact were West Germany who won three golds, one silver and three bronze medals.

Men's Semi-Contact Kickboxing Medals Table

Overall Medals Standing (Top 5)

See also
List of WAKO Amateur European Championships
List of WAKO Amateur World Championships

References

External links
 WAKO World Association of Kickboxing Organizations Official Site

WAKO Amateur European Championships events
Kickboxing in Austria
1984 in kickboxing
Sport in Graz